Leandro Salino do Carmo (born 22 April 1985) is a Brazilian professional footballer who plays as a right back in Villa Nova, on loan from Brazilian club Coimbra.

Club career

Early years and Portugal
Salino was born in Juiz de Fora, Minas Gerais. In his country, after starting out at América Futebol Clube (MG), he represented mainly Ipatinga Esporte Clube, appearing for the club in all three major levels of Brazilian football.

In 2008, Salino only missed six league matches for Ipatinga, but his team ranked last in Série A. During the 2009 January transfer window he moved to Portugal, signing with C.D. Nacional. He made his Primeira Liga debut on 1 February, starting in a 0–0 home draw against Leixões SC, and contributed with 23 scoreless appearances in his first full season as the Madeirans ranked in seventh position, adding eight games in the UEFA Europa League.

On 9 June 2010, Salino agreed to a three-year deal with fellow league side S.C. Braga. He played 38 matches all competitions comprised in his first year, but was an unused substitute in the final of the Europa League, a 0–1 loss against another Portuguese team, FC Porto, at the Dublin Arena.

Salino scored his first ever goal in the league on 13 August 2010, netting his team's last in a 3–1 home victory over Portimonense SC. In 2012–13, he was used more often than not as right back by new manager José Peseiro.

Olympiacos
On 9 July 2013, Salino signed a three-year contract with Greek champions Olympiacos FC. In matchday six of the UEFA Champions League he was included in the "Team of the week" alongside teammate Javier Saviola, as his team secured progression to the knockout stages with a 3–1 home win against R.S.C. Anderlecht.

On 25 February 2014, Salino played the full 90 minutes in Olympiacos's historic 2–0 round-of-16 first-leg defeat of Manchester United in Piraeus. He also featured in the second match, being booked in a 0–3 loss as Robin van Persie scored all of the opposition's goals. In his debut season he helped his new club to its 41st Super League title, the championship being sealed with five fixtures remaining.

Vitória
On 24 December 2016, Salino returned to his homeland after eight years after signing a one-year contract with Esporte Clube Vitória.

Personal life
Salino's twin brother, Léo, was also a footballer and a defensive midfielder.

Honours
Ipatinga
Campeonato Mineiro: 2005

Flamengo
Taça Guanabara: 2007
Campeonato Carioca: 2007

Braga
Taça da Liga: 2012–13
UEFA Europa League runner-up: 2010–11

Olympiacos
Super League Greece: 2013–14, 2014–15, 2015–16
Greek Football Cup: 2014–15; Runner-up 2015–16

References

External links
CBF data 

1985 births
Living people
People from Juiz de Fora
Brazilian twins
Twin sportspeople
Brazilian footballers
Association football defenders
Association football midfielders
Association football utility players
Campeonato Brasileiro Série A players
Campeonato Brasileiro Série B players
Campeonato Brasileiro Série C players
Campeonato Brasileiro Série D players
Cruzeiro Esporte Clube players
América Futebol Clube (MG) players
Ipatinga Futebol Clube players
CR Flamengo footballers
Esporte Clube Vitória players
Santa Cruz Futebol Clube players
Botafogo Futebol Clube (SP) players
Tupynambás Futebol Clube players
Joinville Esporte Clube players
Primeira Liga players
C.D. Nacional players
S.C. Braga players
Super League Greece players
Olympiacos F.C. players
Brazilian expatriate footballers
Expatriate footballers in Portugal
Expatriate footballers in Greece
Brazilian expatriate sportspeople in Portugal
Brazilian expatriate sportspeople in Greece